The Soham rail disaster occurred on 2 June 1944, during the Second World War, when a fire developed on the leading wagon of a heavy ammunition train.  The wagon contained a quantity of high explosive bombs.  The train crew had detached the wagon from the rest of the train and were drawing it away when the cargo exploded.  The fireman of the train and the signalman at Soham signalbox were killed and several other people injured.  The driver, Benjamin Gimbert, and fireman, James Nightall, were both awarded the George Cross for preventing further damage which would have occurred if the rest of the train had exploded.

Details
At 12.15 a.m. on 2 June 1944 a heavy freight train left Whitemoor marshalling yard, near  (in the Isle of Ely, now in Cambridgeshire).  The train comprised WD Austerity 2-8-0 engine No. 7337, 51 wagons and brake van heading for Ipswich. The cargo on the train consisted of 44 wagons containing a total weight of 400 tons of bombs and a further 7 wagons containing other components e.g. tail fins.  On board the engine were 41-year-old driver Benjamin Gimbert and 22-year-old fireman James Nightall; the train guard was Herbert Clarke.

Gimbert brought the train to a stop and, rather than running for safety, instructed Nightall to uncouple the first wagon from the rest of the train. Nightall managed this quickly although the fire was now quite serious. A much more severe explosion was averted by the men's actions.

The resulting blast killed Nightall immediately. Signalman Frank Bridges, who was on the opposite platform, died the next day. Gimbert, though badly injured, survived. Guard Clarke, although stunned by the blast and suffering from shock, managed to walk to the next signal box to warn the signalman there what had happened. Apart from these four men, five others suffered severe injuries and another 22 minor injuries.

Despite the severity of the explosion, emergency repairs meant that the line was open to freight traffic within eighteen hours and passenger traffic resumed the next day.

Locomotive 7337 was extensively damaged by the explosion but was repaired and returned to service. It later served on the Longmoor Military Railway in Hampshire as No. 400 Sir Guy Williams, and was scrapped in 1967.

Cause
The cause of the fire was never fully explained. The wagon had previously been used to carry a load of bulk sulphur powder and although it would have been cleaned in between loads, the possibility remained that some of the powder was still present.  Although the wagon was sheeted, the theory advanced was that a cinder from the engine had landed in the wagon and had ignited some sulphur which in turn set alight the wooden body of the wagon.

Aftermath
Although this was still a sizeable explosion, the effect and damage was little compared to what would have happened if the entire train load of bombs had exploded.  The conduct of the driver and fireman in attempting, and succeeding, in reducing the result of the incident was recognised by the award in July 1944 of the George Cross to both men.  The citation for the awards read
As an ammunition train was pulling into a station in Cambridgeshire, the driver, Gimbert, discovered that the wagon next to the engine was on fire. He immediately drew Nightall's attention to the fire and brought the train to a standstill. By the time the train had stopped the whole of the truck was enveloped in flames and, realising the danger, the driver instructed the fireman to try to uncouple the truck immediately behind the blazing vehicle. Without the slightest hesitation Nightall, although he knew that the truck contained explosives, uncoupled the vehicle and rejoined his driver on the footplate.

The blazing van was close to the station buildings and was obviously liable to endanger life in the village. The driver and
fireman realised that it was essential to separate the truck from the remainder of the train and run it into the open. Driver
Gimbert set the engine in motion and as he approached a signal box he warned the signalman to stop any trains which were
likely to be involved and indicated what he intended to do. Almost immediately the vehicle blew up. Nightall was killed and
Gimbert was very severely injured.

Gimbert and Nightall were fully aware of the contents of the wagon which was on fire and displayed outstanding courage and resource in endeavouring to isolate it. When they discovered that the wagon was on fire they could easily have left the train and sought shelter, but realising that if they did not remove the burning vehicle the whole of the train, which consisted of 51 wagons of explosives, would have blown up, they risked their lives in order to minimise the effect of the fire. There is no doubt that if the whole train had been involved, as it would have been but for the gallant action of the men concerned, there would have been serious loss of life and property.

Memorial

A permanent memorial was unveiled on 2 June 2007 by Prince Richard, Duke of Gloucester followed by a service in St Andrew's Church, Soham. The memorial is constructed of Portland stone with a bronze inlay depicting interpretive artwork of the damaged train as well as text detailing the incident.

Both Gimbert and Nightall had Class 47 locomotives named after them, although the nameplates have since been transferred to Class 66 locomotives. However, 47579 also retains its name in preservation.

Soham station was closed to passengers in 1965. After over 50 years it was reopened in December 2021. A plaque in memory of the four railwaymen involved was unveiled at the reopening.

Notes

References

Further reading

External links

 Soham Online: The 2 June 1944 train explosion

Railway accidents and incidents in Cambridgeshire
History of Cambridgeshire
1944 in England
Railway accidents in 1944
20th century in Cambridgeshire
Accidents and incidents involving London and North Eastern Railway
1944 disasters in the United Kingdom
June 1944 events
Soham